Samuel Pountney Smith (1812–1883) was an English architect who practised in Shrewsbury, Shropshire, England.  He was influenced by A. W. N. Pugin, and usually designed his churches in Early English style.

Key

Works

References

Bibliography

Lists of buildings and structures by architect